Jeremy Miles Ferguson,  (born January 7, 1981) better known by the stage name Jinxx, is an American musician best known as guitarist, violinist, cellist, pianist, songwriter, and composer of American rock band Black Veil Brides.

History 
Jinxx joined Black Veil Brides in mid-2009 when Andy Biersack was forming his band in Hollywood, California. He had also played in bands The Dreaming, Amen, among others. He got his first guitar when he was two, and started playing live shows with his father at age eight, playing in local bars in Iowa. He is influenced by classical composers Bach and Beethoven. The first album he ever owned was Metallica's fourth album, ...And Justice for All, and he learned to play every track. He and fellow Black Veil Brides guitarist Jake Pitts won Revolver Magazine's Golden Gods Award for "Best Guitarists 2012". He has cited major influences such as Randy Rhoads, Metallica, Megadeth, Danny Elfman, Johann Sebastian Bach, Ludwig van Beethoven, Pyotr Ilyich Tchaikovsky, Wolfgang Amadeus Mozart, and Domenico Scarlatti.

Personal life 

Jinxx married West End theatre dancer/ actress Alice Mogg on September 16, 2018, in London. She is the niece of singer Phil Mogg of classic rock band UFO, and sister of Nigel Mogg, former bassist of The Quireboys. The couple welcomed a son, Lennon, in late 2020.

On December 2, 2019, Jinxx made a post on his Instagram confirming that he has epilepsy. A day later he posted another message thanking everyone for the positive response he received after revealing it. He has since run a few auctions of some of his Black Veil Brides tour memorabilia from which some of the proceeds were donated to the Epilepsy Foundation. Jinxx was diagnosed with epilepsy at 27 years old, after experiencing a tonic clonic seizure on stage, Jinxx struggled for years to find the medication that worked for him, but he has now been seizure free since August 2019.

Awards and Accolades 

Kerrang! Awards 2011 – Best International Newcomer
Kerrang! Awards 2012 – Best Single "Rebel Love Song"
Kerrang! Awards 2013 – Best live Band – Black Veil Brides
Kerrang! Awards 2015 – Best live Band – Black Veil Brides
Revolver Golden Gods 2011 – Best New Band
Revolver Golden Gods 2012 – Best Guitarist "Jinxx"
Revolver Golden Gods 2013 – Song of the year "In The End"
AP Music Awards 2014 – "Most Dedicated Fans"
AP Music Awards 2015 – "Album of the Year"
Billboard 200 Top 20 Album (#14) for "Re-Stitch These Wounds" (Black Veil Brides - 2020)
Billboard 200 Top 20 Album (#14) for "Vale" (Black Veil Brides - 2018)
Billboard 200 Top 10 Album (#10) for "Black Veil Brides (Black Veil Brides - 2014)
Billboard 200 Top 10 Album (#7) for "Wretched and Divine" (Black Veil Brides - 2013)
Billboard 200 Top 20 Album (#17) for "Set the World on Fire" (Black Veil Brides - 2011)
Billboard 200 Top 40 Album (#36) for "We Stitch These Wounds" (Black Veil Brides - 2010)

RIAA Certified Gold Record for single "In The End"

Discography 

 2006 – The Dreaming (Dreamo EP) – Songwriter, composer, guitars, violins
 2008 – The Dreaming (Etched In Blood) – Songwriter, guitars, backing vocals
 2010 – Black Veil Brides (We Stitch These Wounds) – Songwriter, guitars, strings, keys, backing vocals
 2011 – Black Veil Brides (Set The World on Fire) – Songwriter, guitars, strings, keys, backing vocals
 2013 – Black Veil Brides (Wretched & Divine) – Songwriter, composer, guitars, strings, keys, backing vocals
 2014 – Black Veil Brides (Black Veil Brides) – Songwriter, guitars, strings, keys, backing vocals
 2016 – September Mourning (Volume II) – Violins on "Skin and Bones"
 2017 – Marty Friedman (Wall of Sound) – Collaboration, violins on "Sorrow and Madness"
 2018 – Black Veil Brides (Vale) – Songwriter, composer, guitars, strings, keys
 2018 – Dianthus (Worth Living For) – Producer, strings
 2019 – Aesthetic Perfection (Into The Black) - Guitars 
 2020 - Black Veil Brides ("Scarlet Cross" Single) - Songwriter, guitars, strings, keys
 2021 - Black Veil Brides (The Phantom Tomorrow) - Songwriter, guitars, strings, keys

Filmography 

 2012 – Legion Of The Black (Black Veil Brides) – Composer, actor (as The Mystic)
 2012 – Sebastian Bach: Kicking and Screaming and Touring (TV Special) – Performance as himself
 2013 – Black Veil Brides in the Studio: The Making of Wretched and Divine (Documentary) – Appearance as himself
 2015 – Alive and Burning (Black Veil Brides) – Performance as himself
 2017 – Escape Room (Lionsgate) – Composer, original score

Jinxx is currently producing a horror/ thriller feature film "Spirit Lake" with director Will Wernick (Escape Room), inspired by true events from his childhood. Production and release date TBD

References

External links 

1981 births
Living people
People from Webster City, Iowa
American heavy metal guitarists
Black Veil Brides members
Guitarists from Iowa
American male guitarists
Amen (American band) members